General Custer at the Little Big Horn is a 1926 American silent Western film directed by Harry L. Fraser and starring Roy Stewart. It depicts the Battle of the Little Bighorn.

Cast
 Roy Stewart as Lem Hawks
 Helen Lynch as Betty Rossman
 John Beck as General George Armstrong Custer
 Edmund Cobb as Capt. Page
 Dick La Reno
 Nora Lindley
 Arthur Morrison
 Bert Lindley
 Running Deer as Chief Sitting Bull
 Felix Whitefeather
 Black Hawk
 Andre Farneur

See also
 The Scarlet West (1925)
 They Died With Their Boots On (1941)
 Little Big Man (1970)

Preservation status
A print of the film is preserved in the collection of the Library of Congress.

References

External links
 
 General Custer at the Little Big Horn at SilentEra 
 
 lobby poster 

1926 films
Films directed by Harry L. Fraser
1926 Western (genre) films
American black-and-white films
American historical drama films
1920s historical drama films
1926 drama films
Cultural depictions of George Armstrong Custer
Cultural depictions of Sitting Bull
Biographical films about military leaders
Silent American Western (genre) films
1920s American films
Silent American drama films